Ẹ̀bà  / Utara (in Nigeria) as it's commonly known or Pinon (in Togo, Benin, and southern Ghana) is a staple swallow from Nigeria, also eaten in the West African sub-region and other African countries. The term èbà originates from the Yoruba people of southwest Nigeria. It is also called Utara by the Igbo People of Southeast Nigeria. It is a cooked starchy vegetable food made from dried grated cassava (manioc) flour commonly known as garri. It is often eaten with rich soups and stews, with beef, stockfish or mutton. The dish is often described as having a slightly sour, sharp taste. 

Èbà/ Utara is eaten with the fingers, rolled into a small ball, and dipped into thick soups such as okra soup, bitter leaf soup or with either okro, ọgbọnọ (Igbo)/ apọn (Yorùbá), or ewédú,  meat or fish, stewed vegetables or other sauces such as gbẹ̀gìrì, Amiedi (banga soup) or egusi soup.

In West Africa, there two types of garri, the white and yellow; the yellow garri is prepared by frying with the addition of palm oil to give it a yellow colour, white garri is fried without palm oil.

Preparation 
Blended garri flour is mixed into hot water and stirred thoroughly and vigorously with a wooden spatula until it becomes a firm dough that can be rolled into a ball. It can be made with different types of garri. 

Depending on the type of garri flour used, Ẹ̀bà / Utara can vary in colour, from deep yellow to off white. Palm oil is often added to the garri during preparation, resulting in a bright yellow colour.

Nutrition 
Eba is rich in starch and carbohydrates. Eba has a gross energy content of 381.5 kcal which is higher than other cassava products like fufu and lafun with 180 kcal and 357.7 respectively. However, it has a crude protein content of 0.9g/100g, slightly lower than fufu and lafun with 1.0g/100g and 1.1g/100g respectively.

See also

 Amala
 Bread
 Cassava
 Egusi soup
 Fufu
 Garri
 Sadza
 Ugali
 Wheat
 Pounded yam

References

External links
 
 
 

Cassava dishes
Ghanaian cuisine
Nigerian cuisine
Swallows (food)
Yoruba cuisine